Cottonwood County is a county in the U.S. state of Minnesota. As of the 2020 census, the population was 11,517. Its county seat is Windom.

History
The county was created on May 23, 1857, named for the river in Germantown Township ("cottonwood" is the English meaning of the Dakota Sioux word "Waraju"). Minnesota Governor Horace Austin appointed three county commissioners when the county was established. They met at a home about six miles northwest of Windom on the Des Moines River at Big Bend. During this meeting, they designated the commissioners' districts and changed various county officers. The county organization was completed on July 29, 1870. The first general election was held in the county that November. The first deed of record was filed on January 10, 1870. The first land assessments were made in 1871, and the first taxes were paid in 1872.

County NRHP listings
 The Cottonwood County Courthouse (1904), an example of Neoclassical architecture, is listed in the National Register of Historic Places.
 Mountain Park, southeast of Mountain Lake, has been listed on the National Register of Historic Places since 1973. A 1976 archeological dig unearthed evidence of a Fox Indian habitation there circa 500 B.C., the oldest human habitation to be discovered in Minnesota.
 The Jeffers Petroglyphs, near Jeffers, contain pre-European Native American rock carvings. Listed in the National Register of Historic Places.

Geography
The Heron Lake Outflow flows east through the lower part of Cottonwood County. The county terrain consists of low rolling hills, devoted to agriculture. The terrain generally slopes to the east, with the northern portion also sloping north and the lower portion sloping south. The highest point is on the midpoint of the west border, at 1,535' (468m) ASL.

Watersheds
The northeastern part of the county drains north to the Minnesota River through numerous small creeks, the Cottonwood River and Watonwan River. The southwestern part drains south through the Des Moines River. These two watersheds come together at the Mississippi River near Keokuk, Iowa. Most wetlands in the county have been drained for agricultural use.

Lakes

Major highways

  U.S. Highway 71
  Minnesota State Highway 30
  Minnesota State Highway 60
  Minnesota State Highway 62

Adjacent counties

 Redwood County - north
 Brown County - northeast
 Watonwan County - east
 Jackson County - south
 Nobles County - southwest
 Murray County -west

Protected areas

 Delft State Wildlife Management Area
 Dynamite Park
 Lady Bird County Park
 Little Swan Lake State Wildlife Management Area
 Mound Creek County Park
 Mountain County Park
 Pats Grove County Park
 Regehr State Wildlife Management Area
 Red Rock Falls County Park
 Rock Ridge Prairie Scientific and Natural Area
 South Dutch Charlie County Park
 Talcot County Park

Demographics

As of the 2000 census, there were 12,167 people, 4,917 households, and 3,338 families in the county. The population density was 19.0/sqmi (7.35/km2). There were 5,376 housing units at an average density of 8.41/sqmi (3.25/km2). The racial makeup of the county was 95.23% White, 0.34% Black or African American, 0.23% Native American, 1.63% Asian, 0.08% Pacific Islander, 1.35% from other races, and 1.14% from two or more races. 2.19% of the population were Hispanic or Latino of any race. 50.2% were of German and 18.6% Norwegian ancestry.

There were 4,917 households, out of which 28.60% had children under the age of 18 living with them, 58.10% were married couples living together, 6.90% had a female householder with no husband present, and 32.10% were non-families. 28.90% of all households were made up of individuals, and 15.90% had someone living alone who was 65 years of age or older. The average household size was 2.39 and the average family size was 2.94.

The county population contained 25.00% under the age of 18, 6.50% from 18 to 24, 23.20% from 25 to 44, 23.20% from 45 to 64, and 22.10% who were 65 years of age or older. The median age was 42 years. For every 100 females there were 94.50 males. For every 100 females age 18 and over, there were 91.50 males.

The median income for a household in the county was $31,943, and the median income for a family was $40,237. Males had a median income of $28,993 versus $19,934 for females. The per capita income for the county was $16,647. About 7.40% of families and 11.70% of the population were below the poverty line, including 18.40% of those under age 18 and 8.70% of those age 65 or over.

2020 Census

Government and politics
Cottonwood County reliably votes Republican. In only one presidential election since 1964 has it selected the Democratic candidate.

Communities

Cities

 Bingham Lake
 Comfrey (partial)
 Jeffers
 Mountain Lake
 Storden
 Westbrook
 Windom (county seat)

Unincorporated community
 Delft

Townships

 Amboy Township
 Amo Township
 Ann Township
 Carson Township
 Dale Township
 Delton Township
 Germantown Township
 Great Bend Township
 Highwater Township
 Lakeside Township
 Midway Township
 Mountain Lake Township
 Rose Hill Township
 Selma Township
 Southbrook Township
 Springfield Township
 Storden Township
 Westbrook Township

See also
 National Register of Historic Places listings in Cottonwood County, Minnesota

Footnotes

Further reading
 John A. Brown (ed.), History of Cottonwood and Watonwan counties, Minnesota: Their People, Industries, and Institutions: With Biographical Sketches of Representative Citizens and Genealogical Records of Many of the Old Families. In Two Volumes. Indianapolis, IN: B.F. Bowen and Company, 1916. Volume 1|Volume 2
Cottonwood County Minnesota Highway Map, Cottonwood County Highway Department, 2003.
 DeLorme's Minnesota Atlas and Gazetteer.

External links

 Cottonwood County website

 
Minnesota counties
1870 establishments in Minnesota
Populated places established in 1870